The green-and-black fruiteater (Pipreola riefferii) is a species of bird in the family Cotingidae. It is found in Colombia, Ecuador, Peru, and Venezuela, where its habitat is subtropical or tropical moist montane forests.  Because of its range and population size this species is not classified as threatened.

Description
The adult male has a black head, throat and chest glossed with green and mid-green upper parts, with pale tips to the tertial feathers of the wings. There is a yellow rim to the dark chest and the underparts are otherwise yellowish, usually mottled or streaked with green. The female is similar to the male apart from the replacement of the black areas by green, and the absence of the yellow necklace. In both sexes, the iris of the eye is reddish-brown, and the legs and bill are orangish-red. The song is a high-pitched "ts-s-s-s-s-s-s" lasting for a few seconds, slowing and sometimes fading as it winds down.

Distribution and habitat
P. riefferii is native to the lower and mid-level mountain forests on the eastern side of the Andes in South America. This species is more often seen in small flocks than some other fruiteaters.

Status
Though somewhat uncommon, the green-and-black fruiteater has a very wide range. The population size has not been quantified but seems stable and the International Union for Conservation of Nature has assessed the conservation status of the bird as being of "least concern".

References

green-and-black fruiteater
Birds of the Northern Andes
green-and-black fruiteater
Taxonomy articles created by Polbot